Sumedha Karmahe is an Indian vocalist and performing artist. She has performed in different television shows like Sa Re Ga Ma Pa Challenge 2007, Ek Se Badhkar Ek, Dulhan, Maayeka, Ranbir Rano, Saregamapa 2009, Saregamapa Mega Challenge on Zee TV, IPL Rockstars on Colors, The Jam Room on Sony Mix. Her first released playback was in a Santosh Sivan film named Tahaan. She has done playbacks in 5 different languages. Till date she has 3 singles - Bawre Nain, Yaadein, Darmiyaan to her credit. Recently she has given her voice for songs like Toota Jo kabhi Taara along with Atif Aslam for the movie A Flying Jatt, Tum Tum Tum Ho along with Arijit Singh for the movie Fuddu. Her latest hit is Nazm Nazm from the album Bareilly Ki Barfi.  She is from Rajnandgaon, Chhattisgarh.

Hindi single song discography

References

Indian women playback singers
Bollywood playback singers
21st-century Indian singers
21st-century Indian women singers
Singers from Chhattisgarh
Women musicians from Chhattisgarh